Enoch is an unincorporated community in Upshur County, Texas, United States.

History
Enoch was established by members of the Church of Jesus Christ of Latter-day Saints with Samuel O. Bennion's organization of the Enoch Branch in 1911. The first Latter-day Saint settlers had arrived in 1906. In 1908 a Sunday School was organized at Enoch. In 1910 a building was built for the Sunday School. In 1930 it was only one of eight communities in Texas where the church owned a chapel.

By the mid-1930s, Enoch had one church and two stores. In 1938 it had a population of 250. Dairy farming was the most important economic activity.

In 1951, the school in Enoch was consolidated into the Gilmer Independent School District. In the mid-1960s, there were 125 residents of Enoch. By the 1990s, there were no functioning institutions in Enoch. In 2000, there were 25 inhabitants of Enoch.

In October 1953, when the Dallas Stake was organized, the Enoch Branch was a unit in this stake. In 1958, the area was transferred into the Shreveport Louisiana Stake, and the Kelsey Ward and Enoch branch being merged with the Gilmer branch to form the Kelsey-Gilmer Ward, with J. Wilburn Tefteller, Sr. as bishop. As of 1997, Enoch was part of the Gilmer 2nd Ward. There were three wards in Gilmer.

See also
 The Church of Jesus Christ of Latter-day Saints in Texas
 Kelsey, Texas

References

External links
Online book about Enoch residents

Unincorporated communities in Upshur County, Texas
Unincorporated communities in Texas
Populated places established in 1911
1911 establishments in Texas